Hasegawa Settan (長谷川雪旦, 1778–1843) was a Japanese artist who lived during the late Edo period, born in Edo.

His given name was Munehide (宗秀), and his art-name was Gengakusai Ichiyōsai (巌岳斎 一陽庵). He was commonly called Gotō Uzaemon (後藤右衛門). He was originally a wood sculptor and he carved the woodblocks for many ukiyo-e prints. The Edo meisho zue, an illustrated catalogue of the sights of Edo for which he provided in the woodcuts, is one of his major works.  For his artistic accomplishments, Hasegawa Settan was awarded the honorary Buddhist title Hokkyō (法橋 "Bridge of the Dharma").

References

Sources 
  
 

1778 births
1843 deaths
Buddhist artists
Japanese painters
Artists from Tokyo Metropolis